"Le bon roi Dagobert" ("Good King Dagobert"), also called "Le roi Dagobert a mis sa culotte à l’envers", is an old French song featuring King Dagobert (roi Dagobert) and Saint Eligius (saint Éloi), two historical people. The song was created in the 1750s and was intended to ridicule royalty. It was inspired by tales of debauchery of the life of Dagobert I.

For its hourly chime, the clock of the town hall in the Parisian suburb of Saint-Denis alternates between two different tunes, "Le bon roi Dagobert" and "Le temps des cerises".

Translation - First verse

Le bon roi Dagobert
À mis sa culotte à l'envers ;
Le grand saint Éloi
Lui dit : Ô mon roi!
Votre Majesté
Est mal culottée.
C'est vrai, lui dit le roi,
Je vais la remettre à l'endroit.

Good King Dagobert
Has put his breeches on backwards;
Great Saint Éloi
Says to him: O, my king!
Your majesty
Is poorly breeched.
That's true, says the King,
I'm going to put them again the right way around.

Lyrics
 Le bon roi Dagobert
 A mis sa culotte à l'envers ;
 Le grand saint Éloi
 Lui dit : Ô mon roi!
 Votre Majesté
 Est mal culottée.
 C'est vrai, lui dit le roi,
 Je vais la remettre à l'endroit.
 
 Comme il la remettait
 Un peu il se découvrait ;
 Le grand saint Éloi
 Lui dit : Ô mon roi !
 Vous avez la peau
 Plus noire qu'un corbeau.
 Bah, bah, lui dit le roi,
 La reine l'a bien plus noire que moi.
 
 Le bon roi Dagobert
 Fut mettre son bel habit vert ;
 Le grand saint Éloi
 Lui dit : Ô mon roi !
 Votre habit paré
 Au coude est percé.
 C'est vrai, lui dit le roi,
 Le tien est bon, prête-le moi.
 
 Du bon roi Dagobert
 Les bas étaient rongés des vers ;
 Le grand saint Éloi
 Lui dit : Ô mon roi !
 Vos deux bas cadets
 Font voir vos mollets.
 C'est vrai, lui dit le roi,
 Les tiens sont neufs, donne-les moi.
 
 Le bon roi Dagobert
 Faisait peu sa barbe en hiver ;
 Le grand saint Éloi
 Lui dit : Ô mon roi !
 Il faut du savon
 Pour votre menton.
 C'est vrai, lui dit le roi,
 As-tu deux sous ? Prête-les moi.
 
 Du bon roi Dagobert
 La perruque était de travers ;
 Le grand saint Éloi
 Lui dit : Ô mon roi !
 Que le perruquier
 Vous a mal coiffé !
 C'est vrai, lui dit le roi,
 Je prends ta tignasse pour moi.
 
 Le bon roi Dagobert
 Portait manteau court en hiver ;
 Le grand saint Éloi
 Lui dit : Ô mon roi !
 Votre Majesté
 Est bien écourtée.
 C'est vrai, lui dit le roi,
 Fais-le rallonger de deux doigts.
 
 Du bon roi Dagobert
 Du chapeau coiffait comme un cerf ;
 Le grand saint Éloi
 Lui dit : Ô mon roi !
 La corne au milieu
 Vous siérait bien mieux.
 C'est vrai, lui dit le roi,
 J'avais pris modèle sur toi.
 
 Le roi faisait des vers
 Mais il les faisait de travers ;
 Le grand saint Éloi
 Lui dit : Ô mon roi !
 Laissez aux oisons
 Faire des chansons.
 Eh bien, lui dit le roi,
 C'est toi qui les feras pour moi.
 
 Le bon roi Dagobert
 Chassait dans la plaine d'Anvers ;
 Le grand saint Éloi
 Lui dit : Ô mon roi !
 Votre Majesté
 Est bien essouflée.
 C'est vrai, lui dit le roi,
 Un lapin courait après moi.
 
 Le bon roi Dagobert
 Allait à la chasse au pivert ;
 Le grand saint Éloi
 Lui dit : Ô mon roi !
 La chasse aux coucous
 Vaudrait mieux pour vous.
 Eh bien, lui dit le roi,
 Je vais tirer, prends garde à toi.
 
 Le bon roi Dagobert
 Avait un grand sabre de fer ;
 Le grand saint Éloi
 Lui dit : Ô mon roi !
 Votre Majesté
 Pourrait se blesser.
 C'est vrai, lui dit le roi,
 Qu'on me donne un sabre de bois.
 
 Les chiens de Dagobert
 Étaient de gale tout couverts ;
 Le grand saint Éloi
 Lui dit : Ô mon roi !
 Pour les nettoyer
 Faudrait les noyer.
 Eh bien, lui dit le roi,
 Va-t-en les noyer avec toi.
 
 Le bon roi Dagobert
 Se battait à tort, à travers ;
 Le grand saint Éloi
 Lui dit : Ô mon roi !
 Votre Majesté
 Se fera tuer.
 C'est vrai, lui dit le roi,
 Mets-toi bien vite devant moi.
 
 Le bon roi Dagobert
 Voulait conquérir l'univers ;
 Le grand saint Éloi
 Lui dit : Ô mon roi !
 Voyager si loin
 Donne du tintoin.
 C'est vrai, lui dit le roi,
 Il vaudrait mieux rester chez soi.
 
 Le roi faisait la guerre
 Mais il la faisait en hiver ;
 Le grand saint Éloi
 Lui dit : Ô mon roi !
 Votre Majesté
 Se fera geler.
 C'est vrai, lui dit le roi,
 Je m'en vais retourner chez moi.
 
 Le bon roi Dagobert
 Voulait s'embarquer pour la mer ;
 Le grand saint Éloi
 Lui dit : Ô mon roi !
 Votre Majesté
 Se fera noyer.
 C'est vrai, lui dit le roi,
 On pourra crier : « Le Roi boit ! ».
 
 Le bon roi Dagobert
 Avait un vieux fauteuil de fer ;
 Le grand saint Éloi
 Lui dit : Ô mon roi !
 Votre vieux fauteuil
 M'a donné dans l'œil.
 Eh bien, lui dit le roi,
 Fais-le vite emporter chez toi.
 
 La reine Dagobert
 Choyait un galant assez vert ;
 Le grand saint Éloi
 Lui dit : Ô mon roi ! 
 Vous êtes cornu,
 J'en suis convaincu.
 C'est bon, lui dit le roi,
 Mon père l'était avant moi.
 
 Le bon roi Dagobert
 Mangeait en glouton du dessert ;
 Le grand saint Éloi
 Lui dit : Ô mon roi !
 Vous êtes gourmand,
 Ne mangez pas tant.
 Bah, bah, lui dit le roi,
 Je ne le suis pas tant que toi.
 
 Le bon roi Dagobert
 Ayant bu, allait de travers ;
 Le grand saint Éloi
 Lui dit : Ô mon roi !
 Votre Majesté
 Va tout de côté.
 Eh bien, lui dit le roi,
 Quand tu es gris, marches-tu droit ?
 
 A Saint Eloi, dit-on
 Dagobert offrit un dindon.
 "Un dindon à moi!
 lui dit Saint Eloi,
 Votre Majesté
 a trop de bonté."
 "Prends donc, lui dit le roi,
 C'est pour te souvenir de moi."
 
 Le bon roi Dagobert
 Craignait d'aller en enfer ;
 Le grand saint Eloi
 Lui dit : Ô mon roi !
 Je crois bien, ma foi
 Que vous irez tout droit.
 C'est vrai, lui dit le roi,
 Ne veux-tu pas prier pour moi ?
 
 Quand Dagobert mourut,
 Le diable aussitôt accourut;
 Le grand saint Éloi
 Lui dit : Ô mon roi !
 Satan va passer,
 Faut vous confesser.
 Hélas, lui dit le roi,
 Ne pourrais-tu mourir pour moi ?

References

External links

French-language songs
French folk songs
Songs about kings
Cultural depictions of French monarchs
18th-century songs